The Bell is a public house at 29 Bush Lane in the City, London, EC4.

It is a Grade II listed building, probably built in the mid 19th century.

References

External links
 
 

Grade II listed pubs in the City of London